The 2010 Castle Point Borough Council election took place on 6 May 2010 to elect members of Castle Point Borough Council in Essex, England. One third of the council was up for election and the Conservative party stayed in overall control of the council.

After the election, the composition of the council was
Conservative 25
Canvey Island Independent Party 16

Background
8 people stood at the council election as Independent Save Our Green Belt candidates backed by the MP for Castle Point Bob Spink. Spink had resigned from the Conservative party in 2008 and stood at the 2010 general election as an independent.

Election result
In an election held at the same time as the 2010 general election and therefore seeing a higher turnout than in most council elections, the Conservatives stayed in control of the council after defeating competition from independent candidates. Twenty-two-year-old Conservative Andrew Sheldon picked up one seat in St Mary's ward to become the youngest councillor, defeating the only Labour councillor, Brian Wilson. However the Conservatives also lost a seat to the Canvey Island Independent Party in Canvey West.

Ward results

References

Castle Point Borough Council elections
2010 English local elections
May 2010 events in the United Kingdom
2010s in Essex